Dipeptidyl-peptidase II (dipeptidyl aminopeptidase II, dipeptidyl arylamidase II, carboxytripeptidase, dipeptidyl peptidase II, DAP II, dipeptidyl(amino)peptidase II, dipeptidylarylamidase) is an enzyme. This enzyme catalyses the following chemical reaction:

 Release of an N-terminal dipeptide, Xaa-Yaa!, preferentially when Yaa is Ala or Pro. Substrates are oligopeptides, preferentially tripeptides

This lysosomal serine-type peptidase is maximally active at acidic pH.

References

External links 
 

EC 3.4.14